The 2017 Brasil Open was a tennis tournament played on outdoor clay courts. It was the 17th edition of the Brasil Open, and part of the ATP World Tour 250 series of the 2017 ATP World Tour. It took place from February 27 through March 6, 2017, in São Paulo, Brazil, with the final completed on a Monday due to rain.

Singles main-draw entrants

Seeds 

1 Rankings as of February 20, 2017.

Other entrants 
The following players received wildcards into the main draw:
 Orlando Luz
 Akira Santillan
 João Souza

The following player received entry as a special exempt:
 Casper Ruud

The following players received entry from the qualifying draw:
 Marco Cecchinato 
 Guilherme Clezar
 Alessandro Giannessi
 Jozef Kovalík

Doubles main-draw entrants

Seeds 

1 Rankings are as of February 20, 2017.

Other entrants 
The following pairs received wildcards into the main draw:
  Dušan Lajović /  Eduardo Russi Assumpção
  Fabrício Neis /  João Souza

The following pair received entry as alternates:
  Íñigo Cervantes /  Taro Daniel

Withdrawals 
Before the tournament
  Thomaz Bellucci

Champions

Singles 

  Pablo Cuevas def.  Albert Ramos Viñolas, 6–7(3–7), 6–4, 6–4

Doubles 

  Rogério Dutra Silva /  André Sá def.  Marcus Daniell /  Marcelo Demoliner, 7–6(7–5), 5–7, [10–7]

External links 
Official website

 
Brasil Open